The 1994 Hamilton Tiger-Cats season was the 37th season for the team in the Canadian Football League and their 45th overall. The Tiger-Cats finished in 5th place in the East Division with a 4–14 record and failed to make the playoffs.

Offseason

CFL Draft

Preseason

Regular season

Season standings

Schedule

Awards and honours

1994 CFL All-Stars

References

Hamilton Tiger-Cats seasons
Ham